Lower Troswell and Higher Troswell are two farms in the parish of North Petherwin,  Cornwall, England, UK.

See also

 List of farms in Cornwall

References

Farms in Cornwall